"Love Like a Man" is a song and hit single by British blues rock group Ten Years After, first released in 1970 and taken from their album Cricklewood Green.

Singles chart success

The single is the group's only hit in the UK Singles Chart.
Written by the group's lead vocalist Alvin Lee and produced by the group, it was the band's fourth single. The song entered the UK charts at #48 in June 1970 and reached #10 in August finally leaving the chart in October 1970.  In the US, it reached #98. In Canada, it reached #56.

Unusually, the A-side of this single is to be played at 45 rpm whilst the B-side is to be played at 33⅓ RPM. The B-side is a live version of the song recorded at Bill Graham's Fillmore East and runs at 7:56 in marked contrast to the A-side's shorter, 3:05. Earlier versions of the disc carried no mention that the B-side is 'live' only an overprint in black ink on the paper label that the playing speed is 33⅓ RPM.

References

External links
 

1970 singles
Ten Years After songs
Songs written by Alvin Lee
1970 songs